Masoud Juma Choka (born February 3, 1996) is a Kenyan footballer who plays as a forward for Saudi Arabian club Al-Faisaly on loan from Moroccan club Difaâ Hassani El Jadidi and the Kenya national team.

Club career

Early years
Born and raised in Isiolo, Juma began playing football at Tumaini Primary School. He then led his Isiolo Barracks Secondary School team to the Coca-Cola/AFCO Inter-military Schools Championship, where he was named tournament MVP with five goals. During this time, he also featured for Isiolo Youth FC, in the fifth-tier Kenyan County Champions League. He then joined FKF Division One club Kambakia Christian Centre FC for a short while before rejoining Isiolo Youth FC in February 2014.

Professional career
He was soon discovered by Kenyan National Super League team Shabana during a national talent search held in Kasarani. During the 2014 season, Juma scored five goals in three months, drawing comparisons to legendary Kenyan striker Dennis Oliech. That summer, after being linked with several top clubs, Juma signed a two-year deal with Kenyan Premier League side Bandari. After struggling in the second half of the year, Juma started the 2015 season with promise. However, in a fixture against SoNy Sugar in April, he suffered an ankle injury which kept him out for five months. Coincidentally, this happened right after earning a call-up to the Kenya U23 squad. He was back in action by September, and helped Bandari close out the season to finish in fourth place. During the 2015 FKF President's Cup final in December, Juma scored eight minutes after replacing Farid Mohammed to seal Bandari's 4–2 win over Nakumatt.

Despite his strong showing after returning from injury, Juma did not receive much playing time during the first half of the 2016 season, mainly due to the acquisitions of Dan Sserunkuma, Edwin Lavatsa and Meshack Karani in January. He made it known through social media that he planned on finding another team during the nearing midseason transfer window. Although technical director Edward Oduor tried denying the reports, Juma was soon linked to SoNy Sugar, and eventually signed with them in June. He scored his maiden goal with his new club in his sixth match of the season, against Western Stima. His stay at SoNy Sugar was highlighted by his "penchant for spectacular strikes," which helped him improve his stock in the eyes of many teams around the league. He also attracted the attention of Kenyan national team head coach Stanley Okumbi, who called him up to the squad in June.

He was picked up by newly promoted Premier League side Kariobangi Sharks in January 2017. He scored five goals in the 2017 President's Cup campaign, including two in the semi-finals against SoNy Sugar to secure the Sharks their first-ever appearance in the finals, where they eventually lost to A.F.C. Leopards. He also earned the Premier League Golden Boot by netting a league-best 18 goals that season. Sharks finished in third place.

In June 2017, Juma trained with Swedish clubs AIK and Jönköpings Södra, followed by South African side Bidvest Wits in July, but he was signed by Cape Town City on 2 January 2018.

On 22 September, Juma signed for Dibba Club in UAE.

On 26 February 2019, Juma joined Libyan champions Al-Nasr Benghazi.

On 29 January 2023, Juma joined Saudi Arabian club Al-Faisaly on loan from Difaâ Hassani El Jadidi.

International career
While at Bandari, Juma earned a call-up to the Kenya national under-23 team, in preparation for the upcoming 2015 African Games qualifying campaign. However, an injury sustained during a Premier League fixture prevented him from joining the national team.

Juma made his senior international debut for Kenya in June 2017, when he was named to the starting XI of a 2019 Africa Cup of Nations qualifying match against Sierra Leone. He was the subject of severe criticism from the Kenyan fans following his performance, mainly stemming from a missed shot in the early minutes of what eventually ended as a 2–1 loss. Critics felt that the starting role should have been given to a more established striker, namely Stephen Waruru (the Premier League's top scorer at the time).

He earned his second cap during a friendly against Mauritania two months later, where he scored with a 58th-minute header.
This match, however, was not considered a full international match, since Kenya fielded a 'B' team composed only of locally based players.

Career statistics

International

International goals
 (scores and results list Kenya's goal tally first)

Honours

Club
Bandari
 FKF President's Cup: 2015
 Kenyan Super Cup: 2016

International
Kenya
 CECAFA Cup: 2017

Individual
Kenyan Premier League top scorer: 2017

Personal life
Juma is a supporter of Arsenal.

References

External links

 
 

Living people
1996 births
Kenyan footballers
Kenyan expatriate footballers
Kenya international footballers
Association football forwards
Bandari F.C. (Kenya) players
SoNy Sugar F.C. players
F.C. Kariobangi Sharks players
Dibba FC players
Al-Nasr SC (Benghazi) players
Cape Town City F.C. (2016) players
JS Kabylie players
Al-Faisaly FC players
UAE Pro League players
Saudi First Division League players
Kenyan National Super League players
Kenyan Premier League players
South African Premier Division players
Algerian Ligue Professionnelle 1 players
People from Isiolo County
2019 Africa Cup of Nations players
Kenyan expatriate sportspeople in the United Arab Emirates
Kenyan expatriate sportspeople in Libya
Kenyan expatriate sportspeople in South Africa
Kenyan expatriate sportspeople in Algeria
Expatriate footballers in the United Arab Emirates
Expatriate footballers in Libya
Expatriate soccer players in South Africa
Expatriate footballers in Algeria
Expatriate footballers in Saudi Arabia
Kenyan expatriate sportspeople in Saudi Arabia
Shabana F.C. players
Libyan Premier League players